The Louis Vuitton World Series may designate:
the 2008 Louis Vuitton Pacific Series
the 2009 Louis Vuitton Trophy
the 2011–13 America's Cup World Series
the 2015–16 America's Cup World Series